The Certificate of Financial Responsibility (COFR) program was created to ensure that tankers, barges, and other vessels used to transport oil and chemical-based products on U.S. should bear any ensuing cleanup costs from spills or leaks.  This is based on the Oil Pollution Act of 1990 and other environmental statutes.

Administration
The COFR program is administered by The U.S. Coast Guard’s National Pollution Funds Center (NPFC). The Vessel Certification Division of the NPFC ensures that responsible parties are identified and held responsible for the expenses incurred during a water pollution incident.

A COFR is issued to vessel operators once they have shown the can pay cleanup and damage costs up to the liability limits required by the Oil Pollution Act.

Conditions of Compliance
With a few limited exceptions, vessels greater than 300 gross tons and vessels of any size that are transferring oil between vessels or shipping oil in the Exclusive Economic Zone (EEZ) are required to comply with the COFR regulations in order to operate in U.S. waters.

Penalties
Operators who do not comply with the COFR requirements are subject to:

Detainment
Denial of entry into U.S. ports
Civil penalties of up to $32,500 per day
Seizure or forfeiture of the vessel

See also
Shoreline Managers

Notes

Pollution